Yue Tze Nam (born 12 May 1998) is a Hong Kong professional footballer who currently plays as a right back for Chinese Super League club Meizhou Hakka.

Club career
Yue was promoted to the first team of Eastern at the start of the 2017–18 season. He debuted for the club on 29 October 2017 in a Sapling Cup match against Tai Po.

Following an impressive display at the 2019 Guangdong–Hong Kong Cup, Yue signed with Eastern's affiliate club Cova Piedade on 1 February 2019.

On 17 July 2019, Eastern announced that Yue would return to the club.

On 15 October 2020, Yue was loaned to Resources Capital. 

On 21 August 2022, it was announced that Yue would join Chinese Super League club Meizhou Hakka on a 3.5 year contract. Yue is five players from Hong Kong who are now plying their trade on the Chinese Super League.

International career
Yue was called up by Hong Kong's head coach Gary White in his October 2018 squad. He made his international debut as a 90th minute substitute in a 1–1 draw against Indonesia on 16 October 2018.

Career statistics

Club statistics
.

International

Honours

Club
Eastern
 Hong Kong Senior Shield: 2019–20
 Hong Kong FA Cup: 2019–20

International
Hong Kong
 Guangdong-Hong Kong Cup: 2019

References

External links

1998 births
Living people
Hong Kong footballers
Hong Kong international footballers
Association football midfielders
Association football defenders
Hong Kong expatriate footballers
Expatriate footballers in Portugal
Hong Kong expatriate sportspeople in Portugal
Hong Kong Premier League players
Liga Portugal 2 players
Chinese Super League players
Eastern Sports Club footballers
Resources Capital FC players
C.D. Cova da Piedade players
Meizhou Hakka F.C. players
Expatriate footballers in China
Hong Kong expatriate sportspeople in China